Clubul Sportiv Municipal Târgu Mureș, commonly known as CSM Târgu Mureș, or simply Târgu Mureș, is a Romanian professional football club based in Târgu Mureș, Mureș County.

The team was founded in the summer of 2018 as the football section of CSM Târgu Mureș.

History
Târgu Mureș' football history began in 1944 with CS Târgu Mureș and continued with ASA Târgu Mureș (1962) and ASA 2013 Târgu Mureș. All three teams played multiple seasons in the Liga I; their best results are finishing as runners-up in the first league (ASA 1962 in the 1974–75 season and ASA 2013 in the 2014–15 season).

CSM Târgu Mureș was founded in the summer of 2018 as the football section of CSM Târgu Mureș, a multi-sport club established on 19 December 2017, following the bankruptcy of ASA 2013 Târgu Mureș.

Ground
The club plays its home matches at Trans-Sil Stadium in Târgu Mureș, with a capacity of 8,200 seats.

Honours
Liga IV – Mureș County
Winners (1): 2018–19

Current squad

Club officials

Board of directors

Current technical staff

League history

References

External links
 

Târgu Mureș
Football clubs in Mureș County
Association football clubs established in 2018
Liga IV clubs
2018 establishments in Romania